EX Hydrae is a variable star classified as an eclipsing intermediate polar-type cataclysmic variable, specifically of the DQ Herculis type. The system varies in apparent magnitude from 9.6 to 14. The orbital period is 98.25696 minutes (0.068233846 days). The system is 65±11 parsecs distant, making EX Hya one of the closest cataclysmic variable stars. The cataclysmic outbursts appear to be caused by accretion of material from the M-star to the white dwarf.

EX Hydrae also possess a 67-minute oscillation, believed to be caused by the spin period of the white dwarf component.  EX Hydrae's outbursts are unpredictable.

References

External links
 AAVSO Variable Star of the Month. EX Hydrae: April 2009 

Hydrae, EX
Hydra (constellation)
White dwarfs
Intermediate polars